USS Wenatchee may refer to the following ships operated by the United States Navy:

, was a  laid down in 1944 and struck in 1962
 , was a  acquired in 1970 and in active service

United States Navy ship names